Bogalusa Boogie is a studio album by the American zydeco musician Clifton Chenier. It was released in 1975 via Arhoolie Records. The album was inducted into the Grammy Hall of Fame in 2011. In 2016, the album was inducted into the Library of Congress' National Recording Registry.

Production
The album was produced by Chris Strachwitz, and was recorded at the Studio in the Country, in Bogalusa, Louisiana. Chenier was back by his Red Hot Louisiana Band.

Critical reception

Robert Christgau wrote: "Crisp, spirited, with John Hart's tenor sax applying a crucial boot in the ass to each side and Cleveland C. rubbing his board to beat the band, this is where Clifton C. finally gets one of his famous parties onto a record."

AllMusic thought that "the medium tempo blues numbers such as 'Quelque Chose Sur Mon Idee' are really beautiful, while the instrumental 'Ride 'Em Cowboy' is simply lots of fun, the honking tenor sax and clickety-clacking rubboard riding high in the saddle." The Rolling Stone Album Guide deemed the album "a near-flawless recording." The Washington Post called it "probably the best zydeco album of all time," writing that "like Muddy Waters's 1954 group, Chenier's 1975 ensemble is one of the great bands in American history, and they rip through this set without taking any prisoners."

Track listing

Personnel
Clifton Chenier - piano accordion
Joe Brouchet - bass
Cleveland Chenier - rub board
John Hart - tenor sax
Robert St. Julian - drums
Paul Senegal - guitar

References

United States National Recording Registry recordings
1975 albums
Arhoolie Records albums
Zydeco albums